A Day in the Life is an album by the jazz guitarist Wes Montgomery, released in 1967. It reached number one on the Billboard Jazz album chart and number 2 on the R&B chart. It also reached number 13 on the Billboard 200. The single "Windy" became his biggest Hot 100 hit, peaking at number forty-four.

After recording for Riverside and Verve, Montgomery signed with A&M. His renditions of pop hits were played regularly on Top 40 radio.

Reception 

In his AllMusic review of the album, Scott Yanow wrote:

Track listing

Personnel

Wes Montgomery – guitar
Herbie Hancock – piano
Ron Carter – bass
Grady Tate – drums
Ray Barretto – percussion
Jack Jennings – percussion
Joe Wohletz – percussion
Ray Alonge – French horn
Phil Bodner – woodwind
Julius Brand – violin
Peter Buonconsigilio – violin
Mac Ceppos – violin
Lewis Eley – violin
Harry Glickman – violin
Harry Katzman – violin
Leo Krucczek – violin
Sylvan Shulman – violin
Gene Orloff – violin
Tosha Samaroff – violin
Jack Zayde – violin
Harry Urbont – violin
Harold Coletta – viola
Emanuel Vardi – viola
George Marge – flute
Joe Soldo – flute
Romeo Penque – flute
Margaret Ross – harp
Alan Shulman – cello
Charles McCracken – cello
Stanley Webb – flute, woodwind

Production notes:
Creed Taylor – producer
Don Sebesky – arranger, conductor
Rudy Van Gelder – engineer
Pete Turner - photography

Chart positions

References

1967 albums
Wes Montgomery albums
Albums produced by Creed Taylor
A&M Records albums
Albums recorded at Van Gelder Studio
Albums arranged by Don Sebesky
Albums conducted by Don Sebesky